Stephen Fairless (born 21 May 1962) is an Australian former cyclist. He competed in two events at the 1988 Summer Olympics.

References

External links
 

1962 births
Living people
Australian male cyclists
Olympic cyclists of Australia
Cyclists at the 1988 Summer Olympics
Place of birth missing (living people)